The 2016 Futsal Thailand League (also known as the AIS Futsal Thailand League for sponsorship reasons) is the top-tier professional Futsal league under Football Association of Thailand (FAT) and Advanced Info Service (AIS)'s control. This is the eighth season of the league, the top Thai professional Futsal league. A total of 14 teams are competing in the league. The season is going to begin in May 2016.

Chonburi Blue Wave are the defending champions, having won the league title the previous season.

Following the death of King Bhumibol Adulyadej, the Football Association of Thailand ended the league after week 15. Chonburi Blue Wave who was the leader at that time was awarded as the champion.

Teams 
A total of 14 teams is going to take place the league.

Promoted teams

Kasem Bandit and Department of Highways were two teams that promoted from 2015 Thailand Division 1 Futsal League.

Renamed teams

Phuket United renamed to Bangkok City.

Sri Pathum - Sisaket renamed to Thai-Tech.

League table

Results 
Results of the 2016 Futsal Thailand League.

Week 1

Week 2

Week 3

Week 4

Week 5

Week 6

Week 7

Week 8

Week 9

Week 10

Week 11

Week 12

Week 13

Week 14

Week 15

References

Futsal in Thailand